The 2022–23 season is Dunfermline Athletic's first season in Scottish League One, following their relegation from the Scottish Championship via the playoffs.

Squad list

Results & fixtures

Pre-season

Scottish League One

Scottish League Cup

Group stage

Table

Scottish Challenge Cup

Scottish Cup

Squad statistics

Appearances and goals

|-

|-
|colspan="14"|Players who left during the season:

|}

Goalscorers

Disciplinary record

Club statistics

League table

Transfers

First team

Players in

Players out

Loans in

Loans out

References

Dunfermline Athletic F.C. seasons
Dunfermline Athletic